Velika Ilova Gora is a settlement in the Municipality of Grosuplje in central Slovenia. The area is part of the historical region of Lower Carniola. The municipality is now included in the Central Slovenia Statistical Region.

Church

The local church is dedicated to the Trinity and belongs to the Parish of Kopanj. It was first mentioned in written documents dating to 1433 and has some 17th- and 19th-century additions.

References

External links

Velika Ilova Gora on Geopedia

Populated places in the Municipality of Grosuplje